Keith Miller was part of the Australian cricket team that toured England in 1953.  While Miller was personally successful on tour, Australia lost the Ashes series to England, one Test to nil.

Early matches
Australia proceeded to the 1953 Ashes tour, travelling to England aboard the Orcades after leaving Australia in late March. They almost did so with their three main bowlers marooned in an Italian jail. During a stopover at Naples on the sea voyage to England, Miller had taken Lindwall and Johnston to watch a rehearsal of La Boheme at the Teatro di San Carlo. The trio ignored the doorkeeper's attempt to stop them attending what was meant to be a private rehearsal, and proceeded inside to the auditorium. When they attempted to return to the boat, they found that the doorkeeper had locked them inside and called the police. Lindwall broke the door's lock and the pacemen ran back to the dock just before the gangplank was being pulled away. The Australians arrived at Southampton after four weeks at sea. He was embroiled in further controversy when Bumper, a book that he had produced with his ghost-writer Dick Whitington, criticised his captain Hassett as being too cautious. The book commented that "Hassett deals, or fails to deal with things as they occur". Early on the tour, the Evening News ran the headline "Keith Miller Criticises his Captain". The poker-faced Hassett kept his cool at a welcome reception hosted by the Journalists' Association, introducing Miller to the guests by saying "There is Keith Miller, whom you all know well. I hear he has written a book. I know nothing about it."

The burden on Miller and Lindwall increased when Johnston broke down in the non-first-class tour game against East Molesey and then returned with diminished powers. Miller scored 33 and bowled five unsuccessful overs as Australia won the tour opener. Johnston had taken the most wickets on the 1948 tour, allowing Miller and Lindwall to focus on short, sharp bursts with the new ball against England's leading batsmen. Miller had to bowl 28 overs for 56 runs without taking a wicket in the tour's opening first-class fixture against Worcestershire, who made 7/333 declared. He then came to the crease with Australia struggling at 2/28 and proceeded to score an unbeaten 220 in just over six hours as Australia reached 7/542, whereupon the match ended in a draw. He featured in a 198-run partnership for the fourth wicket with Graeme Hole, who made 112, taking Australia from the precarious position of 3/28 to 4/226. This was followed by a 171-run partnership for the seventh wicket with fellow all-rounder Ron Archer, who made 108. He was run out for 42 against Leicestershire, featuring in a partnership of 98 with Neil Harvey, who made 202 not out as the Australians amassed 443. As the matches against Worcestershire and Leicestershire were played consecutively without a rest day between fixtures, Miller was given a light workload with the ball after his long innings in the former match. He was required only to bowl five wicketless overs in the second innings after the Australians enforced the follow on and completed an innings victory.

He then scored 159 not out as Australia amassed 6/453 declared before taking 1/21 in a win by an innings and 194 runs against Yorkshire. This time the innings was patient, taking 330 minutes, after being dropped in the slips when he was 20. The spectators were unfamiliar with this style of batting from Miller and sardonically slow-handclapped him. He was part of a middle-order fightback for Australia, putting on stands of 143 and 152 with Jim de Courcy (53) and Richie Benaud (97) for the fifth and sixth wickets respectively, after Hassett's men had fallen to 4/149.

He also took his first wicket of the tour in the second innings, ending with 1/21 from 14 overs. After batting for much of the first and second day, Miller was rested from his bowling duties during the first innings and was not asked to roll his arm over until the third day, once the other Australian bowlers had done most of the damage after asking the hosts to follow on. At this point, Miller had scored 421 runs in the first seven days of May without being dismissed by a bowler, and the media began to speculate that he could score 1000 runs in one month, something that had been done on a tour only by Bradman. This was hampered when he was rested from the match against Surrey at The Oval after playing in three consecutive first-class matches. Australia easily won the match by an innings.

Tests
Miller's love of horseracing then interfered with his quest. Wanting to attend an afternoon race meeting, he convinced his captain Hassett to allow him to open the batting in the morning against Cambridge University after the Australians won the toss. Not intending to play a long innings, he attacked the bowling and was out for 20, before heading for the track. Miller had received gambling advice from a jockey friend. However, all six of the horses that Miller backed went on to lose and Miller and ran out of money. He went to place a bet on a seventh horse, only to find that he was no money left. The horse went on to win. Miller expected Australia to bat for the entire day, only to return late in the day to see Hassett leading the team onto the field for Cambridge's innings, the tourists having been bowled out for 383. Miller was not required to bowl in the first innings, before taking 2/27 in the second innings, including the wicket of top-scorer Raman Subba Row as Australia won by an innings and 110 runs.

This was followed by a match against the Marylebone Cricket Club at Lord's, which fielded a virtual England Test team. Seven of the MCC's representatives went on to play in the First Test, while three others had already had Test experience, including former national captain Freddie Brown, so it was an opportunity to gain a psychological advantage in what amounted to a rehearsal for the Ashes. The first day's play was entire washed out by rain, leaving a bowler-friendly surface when the match started on the following morning. Miller bowled seven wicketless overs, conceding only ten runs, before Doug Ring took over and claimed five wickets as the MCC were dismissed for 80. Miller was then bowled by Trevor Bailey for a duck as the tourists slumped to 4/26 before recovering to take a 99-run first innings lead. In the second innings, Miller took the wickets of English Test opening batsmen, Reg Simpson and David Sheppard, trapping his victims leg before wicket and bowled respectively, to leave the hosts at 2/15 just before stumps on the second day. He later removed Fred Brown and Godfrey Evans in the middle-order, to end with 4/47, as the MCC made 196. The last two wickets came from deliberately unconventional balls, a full toss and a round arm delivery that were designed to surprise his opponents. This left Australia with a target of 98 for victory, but they had only reached 2/13 when time ran out. Miller was not required to bat.

Miller then opened the bowling and took 2/8 as Oxford University were dismissed for 70 after electing to bat. He then made 19, before taking 3/19 in a victory by an innings and 86 runs. However, he felt that umpire Frank Chester had taken a hostile attitude towards the Australians, a feeling that would persist through the summer. Miller then missed the innings victory against Minor Counties, instead spending the weekend with Princess Margaret.

Miller returned for the match against Lancashire, scoring 20 and taking 1/27, his only victim in a rain-affected draw being Cyril Washbrook. The entire first day's play was lost and the match did not reach the second innings. A similar result occurred in the next match against Nottinghamshire, with Miller scoring 48 after taking 0/32 in the hosts' innings. The match was cut short by one day for the coronation of Queen Elizabeth II. Miller then scored six as Australia collapsed from 1/166 to be all out for 325 against Sussex. Miller then opened the bowling in the hosts' innings and bowled tidily, delivering five maidens in his six overs, and conceding only two runs, before he pulled rib muscles, meaning he could not bowl in the First Test at Trent Bridge. he was not required to bat or bowl in the second innings as Australia declared at 1/259 and the hosts hung on for a draw with one wicket intact. Miller was rested for the final tour match before the Tests, which was against Hampshire. The tourists won by 158 runs.

In the first innings of the First Test at Trent Bridge, Miller came to the crease on the first day with the score at 3/128 after Australia won the toss and elected to bat, facing wet conditions after the loss of Arthur Morris and Harvey in quick succession. He scored 55 in a partnership of 109 for the fourth wicket with Hassett. Both players batted patiently, scoring at around two runs per over. Miller was then dismissed by Johnny Wardle while going for a big hit to leave the score at 4/237 early on the second morning. It was a subdued innings from the all-rounder, who had hit only three fours in 184 balls faced. His dismissal triggered a sharp collapse as all the incoming batsmen were unable to pass four and Australia lost a total of 7/12 (including 6/5) to be all out for 249. Miller then looked on as England were bowled out for 144. He scored five in the second innings, caught off a deliberate full toss by Bedser, as Australia collapsed and lost 7/59 to be dismissed for 123, leaving England a victory target of 229. The hosts reached 1/120 before the match ended in a rain-affected draw.

Miller was rested for the match against Derbyshire immediately after the First Test, a rain-affected match that ended in a draw. Australia then travelled to Bramall Lane in Sheffield under the captaincy of Miller. Captain Hassett and his deputy Arthur Morris were rested from the match and stayed in London with the team manager. Miller bowled only one over after Yorkshire won the toss due to his sore rib. Nevertheless, after the first day's play, he organised a party for his young team that lasted until the next afternoon—the rest day. Miller and Lindwall, the two most senior players present, were the last to leave. They woke up with a hangover on the following day just minutes before play was to start in front of a packed stadium of 30,000. With no transport available, a journalist hired a hearse from a nearby funeral home to transport the pacemen to the ground. They arrived just in time and Yorkshire went on to finish at 377, Lindwall taking four of the last five wickets despite his hangover. When it was Australia's turn to bat, Miller rearranged his batting order to allow him more time to recover. As a result, with regular opener Colin McDonald absent hurt, Ian Craig and wicket-keeper Don Tallon opened the batting, but both were dismissed cheaply, for 19 and a duck respectively. However, Graeme Hole (71) and Harvey (69) consolidated the innings, and Miller came in at 3/128 and was the last man to be dismissed, having scored 86 from 195 minutes despite his hangover. He had been dropped five times during his innings, which helped Australia to avoid the follow on and end at 323. Having taken a 54-run first innings lead, Yorkshire reached 3/220 in their second innings and the match was drawn. Miller injury had improved and he took 0/40 in the second innings from 15 overs.

The Test series moved to Lord's, the home of cricket, for the second match. Miller resumed bowling a full workload, sending down 42 overs and taking a total of 1/74. Batting at No. 4, he managed 25 in the first innings, including a six, before being bowled by Wardle as Australia batted first and lost 9/156 to end on 346. England replied and Miller dismissed Trevor Bailey, who had resisted stubbornly in scoring only 2 runs from 34 balls, to take 1/57 from 25 overs as the hosts compiled 372. Promoted to number three in the second innings, he came to the wicket at 1/3 after the fall of Hassett to Brian Statham before batting patiently to reach stumps unbeaten on 58. Arthur Morris was unbeaten on 35 and Australia was at 1/96. The next morning, the pair proceeded steadily to 168, when Morris fell for 89. Miller then registered his first Test century on English soil, before being dismissed for 109 with the score at 4/235. It was the second time in the match that he had been bowled by Johnny Wardle. Miller struck 14 fours and one six during his stay of 271 balls, a relatively patient innings by his standards. Australia lost wickets steadily thereafter and were bowled out for 368. Chasing 343 for victory, England held on for a draw with three wickets in hand. Their defensive approach after stumbling to 4/73 meant that Miller conceded only 17 runs from his 17 overs in the second innings. the all-rounder was not given first use of the ball after his long innings and only bowled later as the tourists attempted to wear down the English middle-order.

Australia then played Gloucestershire. Miller took 1/13 from seven overs, dismissing former Test batsman George Emmett as the hosts were bowled out for 137. He then made 37 in Australia's total of 9/402 declared before taking 3/34 in the second innings, all of them middle-order wickets including the home captain Jack Crapp as the tourists took a nine-wicket victory. He was then rested from the match against Northamptonshire, which Australia won.

More than half of the Third Test at Old Trafford was washed out, with only seven sessions of play, resulting in another draw. It was timely for Australia, as they led by only 77 in the second innings with two wickets in hand after collapsing to be 8/35. Miller made 17 in the first innings before being bowled by Bedser, leaving Australia at 3/48. Australia then recovered with a century stand by Hole and Harvey, eventually ending at 318. Miller then took 1/38 claiming the wicket of Tom Graveney while bowling fast off breaks in England's first innings of 276. He then scored six with the bat in the second innings, before being stumped from the off spin of Jim Laker to leave Australia at 3/18, before his fellow batsmen continued to fall, leaving the tourists at 8/35.

Miller scored only five in a non-first-class match against Netherlands, and did not bowl as Australia won the single-innings match by 127 runs. Australia then played Middlesex at Lord's, where Miller scored a hard-hitting 71 after a night of heavy drinking, later claiming that he decided to attack and entertain because of the presence of Queen Elizabeth II. The Daily Express opined that "It was right royal entertainment". He earlier took 1/13 in the first innings, removing Jack Robertson and bowled four wicketless overs in the second innings as the hosts hung on for a draw, trailing by 154 runs with six wickets in hand.

Australia elected to field on a wet wicket in the Fourth Test at Headingley. Miller dismissed Edrich and Graveney and ended with 2/39 from 28 overs as England were bowled out for 167. However, it was his relationship with umpire Chester that garnered more attention. After a series of declined appeals and a barrage of short-pitched bowling at the English batsmen, Miller broke the stumps and appealed for a run out with the batsman more than a metre out of his ground, but Chester said not out. Angered, Miller appealed four more times for the wicket. Miller made only five in the first innings, to leave Australia at 3/84. However, Australia recovered to reach 266 and take a 99-run lead. In the second innings, Miller and Lindwall launched a short-pitched barrage and Miller dismissed Watson and Reg Simpson in consecutive balls to be 5/171. England were 5/177 a stumps on day four, leading by 78. The pacemen were booed from the field. Miller reacted to one heckler by challenging him to a fight, which was declined. The next day, Miller dismissed Godfrey Evans early to leave England at 6/182, just 83 runs ahead with four wickets in hand, before Trevor Bailey began his resistance. Miller and Bailey were rivals; both were all rounders, but while Miller was attacking, Bailey was stubborn and defensive. Bailey attempted to save the match by time-wasting and causing stoppages by appealing against the light, holding discussions with his partner and withdrawing when the bowler was running in. At one point, Miller lost his cool and aimed a beamer—in an illegal delivery— straight at Bailey's head, further angering the crowd. Miller later took the wicket of Tony Lock to end with 4/63 from a long spell of 47 overs and confronted another heckler on his way back to the dressing room, this time an elderly man. England held on for another draw after Bailey deliberately bowled wide down the leg side to prevent the Australian batsmen from reaching the target and used an uncharacteristically long run-up to slow down the proceedings. The teams would enter the Fifth Test at The Oval tied 0–0.

Miller had a quiet match against Surrey, scoring only one and bowling two wicketless overs for two runs in a rain-affected match that did not reach the second innings. He was rested for the match against Glamorgan before returning against Warwickshire. The home side batted first and reached 143 without loss before Miller took two quick wickets without further addition to the score. He returned to take eighth wicket, prompting a declaration. He ended with 3/48 and made a duck as Australia conceded a first innings lead of 89 runs. Miller then took 2/34, taking the only wickets to fall to a bowler, as Warwickshire declared at 3/76, before falling to Tom Dollery for 10 as the tourists stumbled to 5/53 from 58 overs when time ran out. He then scored 30 and 21 and took match figures of 4/68 as Australia defeated Lancashire by seven wickets. Miller was rested for the match against Essex, Australia's last before the deciding Test at The Oval.

Miller's last Test at The Oval was his least productive; he scored one in the first innings before Bailey trapped him leg before wicket as Australia were bowled out for 275. Miller then took 1/65 with his off breaks as England took a 31-run lead. In the second innings, Miller was dismissed without scoring, caught by Fred Trueman at short leg from Laker's off spin. It was part of a collapse from 1/59 to 5/61, with all the wickets falling to Laker and Lock on their Surrey home ground. Australia were bowled out for 162, leaving England 132 to win. England won the match by eight wickets and regained the Ashes. Miller claimed the wicket of Peter May to leave England at 2/88 but it was not enough to thwart the home team.

Miller's returns were below his Test career standards, with 223 runs at 24.77 and 10 wickets at 30.30. He took two catches in the Tests.

The final Test was followed by eight more matches, six of which were first-class. Miller missed the first of these, which was against Somerset. He returned in the following match against the Gentlemen of England at Lord's, not bowling in the first innings and scoring 14 in the first innings, again trapped leg before wicket by Bailey. He then took 2/59 and scored 67 in the second innings, putting on a century partnership with Morris to seal an eight-wicket win. He followed this with 68 and 1/17 in an innings win over Kent. Miller did little against the South of England, scoring only nine before falling to Doug Wright and taking match figures of 1/38, but Australia nevertheless completed victory by an innings and 163 runs.

Miller ended his tour against the Combined Services at Kingston. Miller came to the crease at 1/2 after Morris was bowled for a duck. He counterattacked and reached his century before lunch, which he washed down with champagne. He then proceeded to 262 not out with 34 boundaries. This included a 377-run fourth-wicket stand by Jim de Courcy in only 205 minutes, followed by an unbeaten 126-run partnership with Craig. He particularly targeted Fred Trueman's bowling as Australia declared at 4/592. Trueman ended with 0/95 from 14 overs. He then took the first two wickets of the innings, both bowled, to leave the hosts at 2/28. He then returned to bowl Trueman and end with 3/17 as the Combined Services were bowled out for 161 and forced to follow on. He took another wicket, again castling the batsman, in the second innings as Australia easily won by an innings and 261 runs.

Miller was rested for the last three matches of the tour. These consisted of a match against TN Pearce's XI, and two matches against Scotland that were not accorded first-class status.

Overall
Miller finished the English summer with 1,433 runs at 51.17, the second highest average behind Harvey among batsmen with over 200 runs. He scored five half-centuries and four centuries, two of which were double centuries. He was the only Australian to hit two double centuries and also took ten catches and 45 wickets at 22.51. For his efforts that summer, Wisden Cricketers' Almanack named him one of its Five Cricketers of the Year.

See also 
Keith Miller with the Australian cricket team in England in 1948
Keith Miller with the Australian cricket team in England in 1956

References

Notes

Keith Miller